The  southwest thin-toed gecko (Tenuidactylus voraginosus) is a species of gecko that is endemic to Afghanistan.

References 

Tenuidactylus
Reptiles described in 1984